The  is a five-passenger compact, later mid-size crossover SUV produced by Toyota since December 1997 in Japan, which was once exclusive to Toyopet Store Japanese dealerships. In export markets, the Harrier was rebadged as the Lexus RX from March 1998 to December 2008. At this stage, Toyota had yet to retail the Lexus brand to its Japanese customers.

The second generation (XU30) debuted in February 2003, along with the export Lexus version. The third-generation RX (separated from the Harrier) arrived in late 2008, while the Harrier continued on in second-generation form unchanged. Lexus had by now made its debut in Japan as an independent marque, thus the third-generation RX was sold in the domestic market in the same livery as its export counterpart.

The third generation (XU60) debuted in 2013, when it morphed into an independent model line constructed on a separate platform from the RX (the Harrier since then built on the same platform as the RAV4) but retaining a visual link with it. Starting at this point, it is considered as a more road-oriented and upmarket alternative to the RAV4, comparable to the luxury-class Lexus NX. From the fourth generation (XU80), it is also sold as the second-generation Venza in North America and China.

The Harrier is named for the eastern marsh harrier, a bird of prey common to Hokkaidō and northern Honshū called the chūhi in Japanese, and an emblem depicting the bird in stylized profile can be found on the grille until the XU60 model.



Lexus RX-paralleled models

Third generation (XU60; 2013) 

Released on 2 December 2013 in Japan for the petrol model and 15 January 2014 for the hybrid model, the XU60 series Harrier replaced not only its XU30 series namesake, but also the XA30 series Vanguard. Unlike the second and third-generation RX, which is built on the K platform, the XU60 series Harrier derived from the XA40 series RAV4's New MC underpinnings.

Trim levels available in Japan include Grand, Elegance, and Premium for both the petrol and hybrid models. The top-of-the-line Premium trim came with JBL GreenEdge audio with 8-inch T-Connect touchscreen entertainment system with navigation and sensing features. A "Style Mauve" special edition and subsequently the "Style Ash" special edition was released later.

The XU60 series Harrier received a facelift on 8 June 2017. For the facelift model, the Grand trim was removed and Elegance became the base trim. The Progress trim replaced Premium as the flagship trim, with the "Metal and Leather Package" added to both Premium and Progress trims. The "Style NOIR" special edition for naturally-aspirated Premium trim were also added later. A Turbo model was introduced with a 2.0-litre turbocharged 8AR-FTS engine mated to a 6-speed U661 automatic transmission, while the 2.0-litre naturally-aspirated 3ZR-FAE and 2.5-litre 2AR-FXE hybrid engines remained.

Toyota Safety Sense P safety system (adaptive cruise control, lane departure assist, pre-collision system and automatic high beam) were standard across the trim levels.

The XU60 series Harrier was the first Harrier to be officially sold outside of Japan. It was offered in Singapore and Malaysia. In Malaysia, it was introduced in 9 November 2017 with two trim levels offered: Premium and Luxury. Both trim levels are powered by a 2.0-litre 8AR-FTS engine.

Engines

Gallery

Fourth generation (XU80; 2020) 

The XU80 series Harrier was announced on 13 April 2020 and went on sale on 17 June 2020. It is built on the same GA-K platform as the XA50 series RAV4. Unlike the previous model, the turbocharged engine option is not available in this generation. It is available in S, G and Z grade levels in Japan. The Leather Package is also available in G and Z grades.

In September 2022, the plug-in hybrid version was released in Japan in a sole Z grade level. It shares the same system with the RAV4 PHEV.

In other Asian markets, the fourth-generation Harrier was launched in Singapore on 29 January 2021. It is offered in Elegance trim with a regular petrol engine, and Premium and Luxury trims with a hybrid engine. It was also launched in Malaysia on 8 April 2021, offered in a single Luxury trim paired with the 2.0-litre M20A-FKS engine and CVT. It is also offered in China under both Harrier and Venza nameplates.

Venza 
The Harrier was unveiled in North America as the second-generation Venza on 18 May 2020. The Venza for this market is only available in a four-wheel drive hybrid powertrain. It went on sale in September 2020. Unlike the Harrier, it lacks the grille-mounted fog lamps on all trims. The second-generation Venza for North American market is built alongside the Harrier in Japan at the Takaoka plant, as opposed to the first-generation model which was built in the United States at Toyota Motor Manufacturing Kentucky. It is offered in LE, XLE and Limited trims.

The Venza is also sold in China by GAC Toyota and produced at the Guangzhou factory. The front fascia differs from the Harrier that is also sold there by FAW Toyota, being produced at the Tianjin factory, making China the only country that offers both the Venza and Harrier models.

Engines

Sales

References

External links 

  (Japan)

Harrier
Cars introduced in 1997
2000s cars
2010s cars
2020s cars
Compact sport utility vehicles
Mid-size sport utility vehicles
Crossover sport utility vehicles
Front-wheel-drive vehicles
All-wheel-drive vehicles
Hybrid sport utility vehicles
Partial zero-emissions vehicles
Vehicles with CVT transmission